Iuliu Hațieganu (April 14, 1885 – September 4, 1959) was a Romanian internist doctor particularly recognized for research done in the field of tuberculosis. He founded in Cluj a valuable school of internal medicine. Today, Cluj University of Medicine and Pharmacy bears his name. He was a member of the Romanian Academy and brother of politician Emil Hațieganu. He was also an architect, and his work was part of the architecture event in the art competition at the 1936 Summer Olympics.

Early life and studies 

Iuliu Hațieganu was born on April 14, 1885 in the village of Magyarderzse, Kingdom of Hungary (today Dârja, Romania) in the Someș Valley, the fifth of 13 children of the Romanian Greek Catholic priest Hațieganu. He began studying at Balázsfalva (today Blaj, Romania), where he had as colleague the future bishop Iuliu Hossu, then studied at the Faculty of Medicine of Franz Joseph University. After completing his doctorate in 1910, he became assistant to professor Zsigmond Puryesz. Since 1914 he was known for performing a study on alimentary galactosury. In 1918, during the Great Union of December 1, Iuliu took part in the Great National Assembly of Alba Iulia, where he has urged his colleagues to hold a congress of Transylvanian Romanian doctors. The event was chaired by young doctor on January 29, 1919 in Sibiu.

His outstanding merits and Puryesz's vision helped Iuliu Hațieganu to become professor of medical clinic at the University of Cluj and first dean of the Faculty of Medicine between 1919 and 1920. In 1929, Professor Iuliu Hațieganu took over the Cluj branch of Transylvanian Association for Romanian Literature and Romanian People (ASTRA).

In the early '30s, he became rector of the University of Cluj, focusing his activity on the importance of a special role of physical education in institutions of higher education. His belief was so strong that in order to attract young people to embrace this bold idea, he organized thematic conferences, published a journal of education, built a sports park in Cluj, hired four physical education teachers. In 1935, Professor Hațieganu wrote: It turned out that physical education is the best method of education, that synergically contribute to strengthening of body and soul, to character building...

Hațieganu was very interested in medical research and humans, and to assist all, such that he provided patients free consultations and advice. He was so interested and experienced, that he could establish the diagnosis of a patient only if he saw how he moves and how he looks. Along with one of his students, Professor Ion Goia, Hațieganu developed pathological model theory of peasants and workers, these patients being hospitalized preferentially because they claim better teaching.

He was inspired by Hippocrates and Pasteur, and was appointed by Tudor Arghezi as "professor of the Romanian medicine".

Iuliu Hațieganu founded the University of Medicine and Pharmacy in Cluj, that exists today, and bears his name since 1993, and was a member of the Romanian Academy. He was well known for interest in the physical education, human health, the creation of the sports parks, but also because of research he has done on tuberculosis.

Basics of Transylvanian medicine 
He was known since 1914 in the speciality literature through a study on alimentary galactosury, published in "Medical Journal" in Budapest. He was one of the university youth delegates to the Great National Assembly in Alba Iulia and upheld in the face of the Ruling Council of Transylvania the establishment of the University of Cluj. Subsequently, he will chair the first Congress of Physicians, where his friend, military doctor Iuliu Moldovan, appointed by the Ruling Council as secretary of public health problems, will report on the health status of the population in Transylvania, emphasizing the need to resume work at the Faculty of Medicine of Cluj.

At 34 years he held his first university lecture in Romanian language in Transylvania, "Catarrhal jaundice problem", through which he laid the foundations of medical higher education in Cluj. In the interwar period, the medicine in Cluj had the most beautiful and full-time results.

Along with Ion Goia, Iuliu Hațieganu gathered to desk outstanding specialists as Victor Papilian, Titu Vasiliu, Iacob Iacobovici, Constantin Ureche, Victor Babeș, Constantin Levaditi or Emil Racoviță. After the Second Vienna Award, Cluj clinics moved to Sibiu.

Professor Hațieganu, whose name it bears today the University of Medicine and Pharmacy, was a rare example. But, the great merit of Hațieganu is that he has managed to create an exceptional teaching staff, who went on to date the value of Romanian medicine. Strong personality, he quickly coalesced a team, which was transformed into a professional team of elite, both at desks and in clinics. From own funds, Hațieganu established between 1930-1932 in Cluj a park for youth sports. Iuliu Hațieganu Sports Park, on the shore of Someș River and with an area of 25 ha, was dedicated to the memory of his only child, dead at only 8 years. Currently, it's named after its founder.

The communist period and involvement in politics 
With the establishment of communism, the new political situation affected both Hațieganu and his collaborators, many being dismissed under the pretext of so-called "popular judgments". Between April 29 and July 14, 1931, Iuliu Hațieganu was named Minister of State in Iorga Government. He was also appointed Minister of Health, but early resigned, inasmuch as it was rejected proposal to establish a portfolio of Physical Education.

References 

1885 births
1972 deaths
People from Cluj County
Academic staff of Franz Joseph University
Academic staff of Babeș-Bolyai University
Rectors of Babeș-Bolyai University
Titular members of the Romanian Academy
Romanian Greek-Catholics
20th-century Romanian physicians
Members of the Romanian Cabinet
20th-century Romanian architects
Olympic competitors in art competitions